DAPA can mean:

 Deferred Action for Parents of Americans, a planned U.S. immigration policy
 Defense Acquisition Program Administration, a South Korean government agency

See also
 Dapa (disambiguation)